Salcantay, Salkantay or Sallqantay (in Quechua) is the highest peak in the Vilcabamba mountain range, part of the Peruvian Andes. It is the 38th-highest peak in the Andes and the twelfth-highest in Peru. However, as a range highpoint in deeply incised terrain, it is the second most topographically prominent peak in the country, after Huascarán.

Salcantay's proximity to Machu Picchu makes trekking around it an alternative to the oversubscribed Inca Trail; this is known as the Salkantay trek.

History

The name Salkantay is from sallqa, a Quechua word meaning wild, uncivilized, savage, or invincible, and was recorded as early as 1583.
The name is thus often translated as "Savage Mountain".

Directly to the north of Salkantay lies Machu Picchu, which is at the end of a ridge that extends down from this mountain. Viewed from Machu Picchu's main sundial, the Southern Cross is above Salkantay's summit when at its highest point in the sky during the rainy season. The Incas associated this alignment with concepts of rain and fertility, and considered Salkantay to be one of the principal deities controlling weather and fertility in the region west of Cuzco.

Mountaineering
Salcantay is a large, steep peak with great vertical relief, particularly above the low valleys to the north, which are tributaries of the Amazon River.

The standard route on the mountain is the Northeast ridge. Accessing the route typically involves three days of travel from Cusco.

Mountaineering history
Salcantay was first climbed in 1952 by a French-American expedition comprising Fred D. Ayres, David Michael Jr., John C. Oberlin, W. V. Graham Matthews, Austen F. Riggs, George Irving Bell, Claude Kogan,  M. Bernard Pierre, and Jean Guillemin. All except Oberlin, Riggs, and Guillemin reached the summit. Two years later Fritz Kasparek fell through a cornice near the summit on the NE ridge.

On June 17, 2013, Nathan Heald (USA), Thomas Ryan (USA), and Luis Crispin (Peru) made the summit at 10:30 am after nine hours of climbing from a high camp at 5,500 m. on the NE ridge. This makes Crispin the first Peruvian climber to summit the mountain. The team took a reading of 6,279 m, S 13° 20.027’, W 72° 32.596’, on a GPS device. On July 31, 2013 a second team led by Nathan Heald (USA), consisting of James Lissy (USA) and Edwin Espinoza Sotelo (Peru) made the summit by the NE ridge. This makes Heald the only person to have summited the mountain twice. Due to glacial retreat, the route is now calculated to be graded D on the French adjectival scale.

See also

 Padreyoc or Quishuar
 List of mountains in Peru, all peaks above 6,000 metres

References

Further reading 
 
 
 
 
  – Also stored at List of mountains in Peru.
 
 
 

Mountains of Peru
Mountains of Cusco Region
Six-thousanders of the Andes